Eilean an Ròin Mòr is an uninhabited island in north west Sutherland.

Geography
Eilean an Ròin Mòr, with its neighbour, Eilean an Ròin Beag, forms rocky peninsula to the north of Oldshoremore beach. Only a narrow channel separates it from the mainland.

The rocky island has little vegetation.

Footnotes

Islands of Sutherland
Uninhabited islands of Highland (council area)